Walkersville may refer to:

Walkersville, Georgia, an unincorporated community 
Walkersville, Maryland, a town in Frederick County
Walkersville, Missouri, an unincorporated community in Shelby County
Walkersville, West Virginia, an unincorporated community in Lewis County

See also
Walkerville (disambiguation)